Renáta Barbara Szebelédi (born 2 August 1993) is a former Hungarian professional boxer who competed held from 2008 to 2013. She held WBC female flyweight title from 2012 to 2013 and challenged for the IBF female junior-bantamweight title in 2012.

Professional boxing record

References

External links
 

Living people
1993 births
Hungarian women boxers
Boxers from Budapest
World Boxing Council champions
Flyweight boxers
Super-flyweight boxers
Bantamweight boxers
Super-bantamweight boxers
Featherweight boxers
Southpaw boxers